Heinrich Hoffmann (8 March 1913 – 3 October 1941) was a German fighter ace in the Luftwaffe during World War II. Hoffmann was credited with 63 aerial victories in 261 combat missions and was the first non-commissioned officer and first posthumous Wehrmacht recipient of the Knight's Cross of the Iron Cross with Oak Leaves, the highest award in the military and paramilitary forces of Nazi Germany during World War II. He was "ace-in-a-day" twice, shooting down five aircraft on a single day.

Early life and career
Hoffmann, the son of carpenter master craftsman Ernst Hoffmann, was born on 8 March 1913 in Pfiffigheim. Pfiffigheim is a borough of Worms, at the time in the Grand Duchy of Hesse and by Rhine, a constituent state of the German Empire. Interested in flight, he was an active member of the Hitler Youth and later with the National Socialist Flyers Corps where he received his first flight training in 1936.

He joined the Luftwaffe in 1937 and was promoted to Unteroffizier (corporal, non-commissioned officer) of the Reserve in 1938. Following fighter pilot training, he was assigned to the 3. Staffel (3rd squadron) of Jagdgeschwader 77 (JG 77—77th Fighter Wing) on 18 May 1940. The squadron was later re-designated and as of 21 November 1940 was known as 12. Staffel (12th squadron) of Jagdgeschwader 51 (JG 51—51st Fighter Wing).

World War II
World War II in Europe began on Friday, 1 September 1939, when German forces invaded Poland. Hoffmann claimed his first aerial victory over a Royal Air Force (RAF) aircraft on 7 September 1940 in the Battle of Britain. In total, he flew 147 combat missions over the English Channel and Britain.

Hoffmann's most successful period as a fighter pilot began in July 1941 during Operation Barbarossa, the invasion of the Soviet Union. He claimed his second aerial victory on 23 June, the second day of the invasion, when he shot down a Tupolev SB bomber. After his 12th victory, he was awarded the Iron Cross 2nd Class on 10 July 1941 followed by the Iron Cross 1st Class on 28 July. He claimed 20 aerial victories during July and 25 in August. He often flew as wingman to Heinrich Bär, contributing to Bär's record of 220 claimed kills, pilot slang for the destruction of an enemy aircraft. On 22 July 1941 Hoffmann claimed his 23rd aerial victory of the war over an Ilyushin Il-2. The Il-2 Shturmovik was a heavily armoured ground attack aircraft which was very difficult to shoot down. Hoffmann became an expert by aiming for the Il-2's non-retractable oil cooler. These kills are listed as "R-3s" on his personal victory list.

He achieved his 33rd aerial victory on 2 August 1941, shooting down three Polikarpov R-5s, one Polikarpov I-15 and two Neman R-10 bombers, making him an "ace-in-a-day". Hoffmann received the Knight's Cross of the Iron Cross after 40 aerial victories on 12 August 1941. He also destroyed three locomotives and 10 trucks in numerous ground support missions He claimed his 50th aerial victory on 2 September 1941 by destroying four R-3s, which may have been R-5s or Polikarpov R-Zs. Two days later he claimed two Ilyushin DB-3s and one Mikoyan-Gurevich MiG-3. On 8 September, Hoffmann claimed two more Tupolev SBs, bringing his total to 55 aerial victories. These were his last successes on the Leningrad front. His unit, IV./JG 51, was relocated further south.

On 3 October 1941, the Luftwaffe officially listed Oberfeldwebel (Staff Sergeant) Hoffmann as missing in action after a low altitude engagement with several Il-2s near Shatalovo in the early evening hours. He was flying the Messerschmitt Bf 109F-2 Werknummer (factory number) 12876 and may have been shot down by the Soviet 233 IAP's (233rd Fighter Aviation Regiment) Starshiy Leytenant Sergeyev, who claimed his first aerial victory in the vicinity where Hoffmann disappeared. Posthumously he was awarded the Knight's Cross of the Iron Cross with Oak Leaves on 19 October 1941, the 36th officer or soldier of the Wehrmacht so honored. This presentation was the first to a non-commissioned officer and the first made posthumously.

Summary of career

Aerial victory claims
According to US historian David T. Zabecki, Hoffmann was credited with 63 aerial victories. Spick also lists him with 63 aerial victories, one during the Battle of Britain and 62 on the Eastern Front, claimed in 258 combat missions. Obermaier lists him with 261 combat missions. Mathews and Foreman, authors of Luftwaffe Aces — Biographies and Victory Claims, researched the German Federal Archives and found records for 63 aerial victory claims, one of which on the Western Front, and 62 Soviet Air Forces piloted aircraft on the Eastern Front.

Awards
 Iron Cross (1939)
 2nd Class (10 July 1941)
 1st Class (28 July 1941)
 Front Flying Clasp of the Luftwaffe for fighter pilots
 Knight's Cross of the Iron Cross with Oak Leaves
 Knight's Cross on 12 August 1941 as Oberfeldwebel and pilot in the 12/Jagdgeschwader 51
 36th Oak Leaves on 19 October 1941 as Oberfeldwebel and pilot in the 12/Jagdgeschwader 51

See also 
List of people who disappeared

Notes

References

Citations

Bibliography

 
 
 
 
 
 
 
 
 
 
 
 
 
 
 

1913 births
1940s missing person cases
1941 deaths
Aerial disappearances of military personnel in action
German World War II flying aces
Luftwaffe personnel killed in World War II
Hitler Youth members
Luftwaffe pilots
Missing in action of World War II
National Socialist Flyers Corps members
Recipients of the Knight's Cross of the Iron Cross with Oak Leaves
People from Worms, Germany
Military personnel from Rhineland-Palatinate